Live from the Paradiso is a live EP by the American indie rock band Cold War Kids. The three tracks were taken from a live show at the Paradiso venue in Amsterdam on November 10, 2008. "A Change Is Gonna Come" is a Sam Cooke cover. The live EP was released on December 2, 2008.

Track listing
"A Change Is Gonna Come" - 4:39 (Sam Cooke Cover)
"Saint John" – 4:07
"Quiet, Please!" - 7:56

References

2008 EPs
Cold War Kids EPs
Downtown Records EPs
Live EPs